Arrou is a former commune in the Eure-et-Loir department in northern France. On 1 January 2017, it was merged into the new commune Commune nouvelle d'Arrou.

Population

See also
 Communes of the Eure-et-Loir department
 Perche

References

Former communes of Eure-et-Loir
Perche